Spectrin repeat containing nuclear envelope family member 3, or Nesprin-3, is a  Nesprin-family protein that in humans is encoded by the SYNE3 gene.  Nesprin-3 localizes to the outer nuclear membrane, where it is retained by SUN domain-containing proteins. The n-terminus of Nesprin-3  faces the cytoplasm and associates with the cytolinker protein Plectin.

References

Further reading